is a passenger railway station located in the city of Ise,  Mie Prefecture, Japan, operated by the private railway operator Kintetsu Railway.

Lines
Miyamachi Station is served by the Yamada Line, and is located 26.3 rail kilometers from the terminus of the line at Ise-Nakagawa Station.

Station layout
The station consists of two opposed side platforms, connected by an underground passage. The station is unattended.

Platforms

Adjacent stations

History
On March 15, 1941, the line merged with Osaka Electric Railway to become a station on Kansai Express Railway's Yamada Line. This line in turn was merged with the Nankai Electric Railway on June 1, 1944 to form Kintetsu. The station was renamed to its present name in March 1933. A new station building was completed in March 1997.

Passenger statistics
In fiscal 2019, the station was used by an average of 620 passengers daily (boarding passengers only).

Surrounding area
Shintomiza independent movie theater
Yokohama Rubber Mie plant
Ujiyamada High School
Ise Library
JR - Yamada-Kamiguchi Station

See also
List of railway stations in Japan

References

External links

 Kintetsu: Miyamachi Station

Railway stations in Japan opened in 1930
Railway stations in Mie Prefecture
Stations of Kintetsu Railway
Ise, Mie